Deeside Ramblers Hockey Club is a field hockey club that is based on Whitchurch Road, Tiverton, Cheshire. The club was founded in 1946.

The club runs multiple teams of all ages including five men's teams with the first XI playing in the Men's England Hockey League Division One North. There are four women's teams with the first XI playing in the North Hockey League. 

In 2020 the men's first XI reached the second highest tier of English hockey by being promoted to the Men's Hockey League Division One North after winning the North Conference. Unfortunately Deeside Ramblers Hockey Club had only played six games when the 2020–21 Men's Hockey League season was cancelled due to the COVID-19 pandemic in the United Kingdom.

References

English field hockey clubs
1946 establishments in England
Sport in Cheshire